Örtülü may refer to:

In Turkey:
Örtülü, Dazkırı, a village in Dazkırı district of Afyonkarahisar Province
Örtülü, Hocalar, a village in Hocalar district of Afyonkarahisar Province
Örtülü, Ardanuç, a village in Ardanuç district of Artvin Province
Örtülü, Bozdoğan, a village in Bozdoğan district of Aydın Province
Örtülü, Maden, a village in Maden district of Elazığ Province, see populated places in Elazığ Province

Örtülü, Kınık, a village in Kınık district of İzmir Province, see populated places in İzmir Province
Örtülü, Gülnar, a village in Gülnar district of Mersin Province
Örtülü, Of, a village in Of district of Trabzon Province, see populated places in Trabzon Province